Judge Goldberg may refer to:

Alan Goldberg (judge) (1940–2016), judge of the Federal Court of Australia
Irving Loeb Goldberg (1906–1995), judge of the United States Court of Appeals for the Fifth Circuit
Marilyn Goldberg (fl. 1970s–2000s), judge of the Family Division of the Manitoba Court of Queen's Bench
Mitchell S. Goldberg (born 1959), judge of the United States District Court for the Eastern District of Pennsylvania
Stanley Goldberg (born 1939), special trial judge of the United States Tax Court

See also
Justice Goldberg (disambiguation)